Christine Carère (27 July 1930 – 13 December 2008), born Christine de Borde, was a French film actress who co-starred in the 1966 American television series Blue Light.

Biography
Born in Dijon, France, in 1930, Carère appeared in 25 films and the television series Blue Light between 1951 and 1966. She was brought out to Hollywood to appear in A Certain Smile in 1958 and had a brief American career.

Carere died in Fréjus, France, on 13 December 2008.

Filmography

References

External links

Image of Susan Cabot, Sal Mineo and Christine Carere at the motion picture premiere of "Diary of Anne Frank" in Los Angeles, 1959. Los Angeles Times Photographic Archive (Collection 1429). UCLA Library Special Collections, Charles E. Young Research Library, University of California, Los Angeles.

1930 births
2008 deaths
French film actresses
French television actresses
20th-century French actresses
Actors from Dijon